The 2021 Supercars Championship (commercially known as the 2021 Repco Supercars Championship) was a motor racing series for Supercars. It was the twenty-third running of the Supercars Championship and the twenty-fifth series in which Supercars have contested the Australian Touring Car Championship, the premier title in Australian motorsport. Atlanta-based international auto parts conglomerate Genuine Parts Company,  through the consumer auto parts brand Repco, replaced Virgin Australia as naming rights sponsor under a five-year partnership, which was later expanded to eight years at the end of the 2022 prizegiving banquet.

Shane van Gisbergen and Triple Eight Race Engineering won the drivers' and teams' championship respectively with one round to go.

Teams and drivers 
The following teams and drivers competed in the 2021 championship.

Team changes 
In February 2020, Holden's parent company General Motors announced it would retire the Holden name by the end of 2020. The Commodore ZB continues to be raced in 2021, albeit with no factory support.

Team Penske sold its majority shareholding in DJR Team Penske at the end of 2020, the team reverting its name to Dick Johnson Racing, which was last used in 2014.

The Grove Group purchased a majority in Kelly Racing, to become Kelly Grove Racing.

Blanchard Racing Team ceased to be a customer of Brad Jones Racing and took its Racing Entitlement Contract (REC) to become a standalone team with an ex-23Red Racing Ford Mustang. To allow it to continue fielding four cars, Brad Jones Racing purchased 23Red Racing's REC that was leased to Tickford Racing in 2020, which saw the latter downsize from four cars to three cars.

Driver changes 
Dick Johnson Racing fielded an all new line-up for 2021. Scott McLaughlin did not defend his title, leaving the series to race in the IndyCar Series with Team Penske. This was the first time the champion has not returned to defend his championship since Craig Lowndes did not defend his 1996 title. It was originally planned that he would return to drive with the team as an endurance co-driver, however this did not eventuate due to ongoing COVID-19 travel restrictions. Fabian Coulthard moved to Team Sydney. Anton de Pasquale, who moved from Erebus Motorsport, and Will Davison drove for the team. For Davison, he returned to the team he last raced for full time from 2006 until 2008.

Erebus Motorsport fielded an all new line-up. David Reynolds and Anton de Pasquale left the team, and were replaced by Super2 drivers Will Brown and Brodie Kostecki. Reynolds returned to Kelly Grove Racing, having last raced for the team in 2011, to replace Rick Kelly, who retired from full-time racing at the end of 2020.

Tickford Racing scaled back to three cars, Lee Holdsworth departed the team and Jack Le Brocq moved to the number 5 car. Holdsworth joined Walkinshaw Andretti United as an endurance co-driver with Chaz Mostert.

Garry Jacobson left Matt Stone Racing to join Team Sydney. Zane Goddard and Jake Kostecki, who shared a car for the team in 2020, both raced for the team in all races.

As a result of Team Sydney signing Fabian Coulthard and Garry Jacobson, Chris Pither and Alex Davison did not return as full-time drivers. Pither joined Brad Jones Racing as an endurance co-driver with Macauley Jones and Davison joined Dick Johnson Racing as an endurance co-driver for brother Will Davison due to Scott McLaughlin's inability to return for Bathurst.

Mid-season changes 
On 4 November, Kelly Grove Racing driver David Reynolds was ruled out of the remaining Sydney Motorsport Park rounds for failing to comply with New South Wales Health Orders regarding mandatory COVID-19 vaccination. He was replaced by Luke Youlden, who made his solo debut in the series. Reynolds was originally scheduled to return to the team for the Bathurst 1000, however on 18 November, it was announced that he would return for round 11 at Sydney Motorsport Park.

Calendar

Calendar changes
The Adelaide 500 did not appear on the calendar for the first time since 1998, with the South Australian Tourism Commission withdrawing its financial support citing the after-effects of the COVID-19 pandemic and dwindling attendances as key factors.

Auckland, Gold Coast, Perth, Tasmania, Melbourne and Winton were due to return to the calendar after they were cancelled in 2020 due to the COVID-19 pandemic.

The season commenced with a sprint round, the Mount Panorama 500, at Mount Panorama after the Bathurst 12 Hour was cancelled due to the ongoing travel restrictions from the COVID-19 pandemic. The season was intended to end at the Gold Coast, changing from two 300 km endurance races to two single driver 250 km sprint races to become the Gold Coast 500. However, the Gold Coast round was subsequently cancelled.

Sandown was dropped from the original calendar, however was reinstated after the Melbourne 400 supporting the Australian Grand Prix was postponed and later cancelled. In doing so, Sandown hosted its first sprint round since 2011.

Impact of COVID-19 pandemic 
A pre-season test day was planned for all teams at Sydney Motorsport Park. With COVID-19 border closures, this was amended with all Queensland based teams and Team Sydney using Queensland Raceway, while the Victorian teams and Brad Jones Racing used Winton.

The Albert Park round, which was scheduled to be a support category of the Australian Grand Prix, was moved to Sandown Raceway after the Grand Prix was postponed, then later cancelled in July 2021.

The Tasmania SuperSprint round was rescheduled from 10–11 April to 17–18 April due to a COVID-19 outbreak in Brisbane.

The Winton SuperSprint round was postponed due to a COVID-19 outbreak in Melbourne. Subsequently its place on the calendar was replaced by the Townsville SuperSprint, replicating the Townsville double header in 2020.

With challenges from COVID-19, the calendar was revised, with the series set to resume at the Winton SuperSprint, with the Sydney SuperNight being rescheduled to the 19–21 November due to a COVID-19 outbreak in Sydney, it was due to be held on 21–22 August. Phillip Island was due to return to the calendar for the first time since 2019. Subsequently the Perth and Auckland events were cancelled.

The calendar was revised once again, as the COVID-19 Delta outbreaks in New South Wales and Victoria caused the Phillip Island, Winton and Gold Coast events to be cancelled. The series resumed at Sydney Motorsport Park, with a quadruple-header utilising various formats and a mix of day and night racing, and ended at the Bathurst 1000.

Series changes

Regulation changes
The championship awarded five bonus championship points to the driver who sets the fastest lap. These points will only be awarded in the sprint races.

A third tyre type, the Super Soft, was used at the Darwin and the fourth Sydney Motorsport Park events.

Other changes
Repco, who were already the Supercars’ official automotive parts retailer, succeeded Virgin Australia as the title sponsor of the series until 2025.

A new five-year broadcast deal commenced in 2021. Fox Sports are continuing to show all rounds while the Seven Network took over from Network Ten as the free to air broadcaster, showing six rounds live, including the Bathurst 1000.

Results and standings

Season summary

Points system
Points were awarded for each race at an event, to the driver or drivers of a car that completed at least 75% of the race distance and was running at the completion of the race. At least 50% of the planned race distance must be completed for the result to be valid and championship points awarded.

Bathurst: Used for the Bathurst 1000.
2*250 km: Used for the Mount Panorama 500, Townsville 500 and Sydney SuperNight 3.
SuperSprint: Used for all SuperSprint races, the Darwin Triple Crown and Sydney SuperNight 1 and 2.

Drivers' Championship

Teams' championship

Beaurepaires Sydney Cup

Notes

References

External links

Supercars Championship seasons